Plantar digital nerves may refer to;

 Common plantar digital nerves of medial plantar nerve
 Common plantar digital nerves of lateral plantar nerve
 Proper plantar digital nerves of lateral plantar nerve
 Proper plantar digital nerves of medial plantar nerve